Pete Smith may refer to:
Pete Smith (announcer) (born 1939), Australian radio and television announcer
Pete Smith (basketball) (born 1947), former basketball player
Pete Smith (baseball, born 1940), Major League Baseball pitcher, 1962–1963
Pete Smith (baseball, born 1966) , Major League Baseball pitcher, 1987–1998
Pete Smith (film producer) (1892–1979), film producer and narrator
Pete Smith (actor) (1958–2022), New Zealand actor
Pete Smith (cyclist) (born 1944), British Olympic cyclist
Pete Smith (speedway rider, born 1942), British speedway rider 
Pete Smith (speedway rider, born 1957), British speedway rider

See also
Peter Smith (disambiguation)